Mitso Asen or Micho Asen  (Мичо Асен) was the tsar of Bulgaria from 1256 until 1257.

Reign
Mitso Asen ascended the throne by virtue of his marriage to Maria, a daughter of Ivan Asen II of Bulgaria by Irene Komnene of Epirus. The dates of his birth and death are unknown, and his antecedents are unclear, but neither his name (which is found in official contexts and is not the diminutive of "Michael"), nor his career described in the Byzantine sources allow an identification with Michael, the son of the Rus' prince and Hungarian Ban Rostislav Mikhailovich, nor any other member of the house of Chernigov. It is likely that, like his successor Constantine Tikh, Mitso Asen adopted the name Asen after his accession to the throne.

He became emperor of Bulgaria after the murder of his wife's cousin, Kaliman Asen II, in 1256. Although he acquired some support in the capital Tărnovo and in Preslav, he was faced by the hostility of much of the provincial nobility. Following an obscure unsuccessful campaign against Theodore II Lascaris of the Empire of Nicaea, Mitso lost control even over the commoners.

When the nobility proclaimed Constantine Tikh emperor instead, Mitso and his family fled the capital in 1257 and attempted to resist from Preslav and then Mesembria (now Nesebăr). In exchange for asylum and lands, he turned over Mesembria and its environs to Emperor Michael VIII Palaiologos and sought refuge in Nicaea. He was given lands in the Troad, where he remained with his family. The date of his death is unknown, but it is likely that he was no longer alive in 1277/1278, when his son Ivan Asen III was put forward as a claimant to the Bulgarian throne by the Byzantine Emperor Michael VIII.

Family
By his marriage with Maria of Bulgaria, Mitso had two known children:
 Ivan Asen III, emperor (tsar) of Bulgaria 1279–1280.
 Kira Maria, who married George Terter I of Bulgaria.

References
 John V. A. Fine, Jr., The Late Medieval Balkans, Ann Arbor, 1987.

External links
 Detailed List of Bulgarian Rulers

13th-century births
13th-century deaths
13th-century Bulgarian emperors
Eastern Orthodox monarchs
Mitso
Bulgarian people of the Byzantine–Bulgarian Wars